Ma Wan Park is a park on Ma Wan island, New Territories, Hong Kong. It is operated by Sun Hung Kai Properties with investment from the Hong Kong Government. Ma Wan Island is connected to Tsing Yi Island by the Tsing Ma Bridge.

The park is billed as a tourist attraction and education centre that combines nature, learning, arts and love, with an emphasis on outdoor interactive instruction. It adjoins the Park Island apartment complex, mainly developed by Sun Hung Kai Properties as part of the Ma Wan Development joint venture project.

Admission to the Nature Garden is restricted for some schedule, else the entrance is free. Bookings are required for group visits. Exploration activities are available from 9:00 am to 1:00 pm on Mondays, Fridays and Saturdays. Registration is required and there is an admission fee.

Noah's Ark

The park also features Noah's Ark, a real size replica of the biblical Noah's Ark. Inside the ark are exhibitions, restaurants and a hotel.

References

External links

Ma Wan Park - official website
Dr Edward Cy Yiu, 3.2 Real Estate Development Finance (REDF), Department of Real Estate and Construction, University of Hong Kong, January 2007, pp. 24–30

Amusement parks in Hong Kong
Ma Wan
Sun Hung Kai Properties